Thomas Johnson (March 16, 1854 – January 26, 1933) was a member of the Wisconsin State Assembly.

Biography
Johnson was born in Norway on March 16, 1854. He moved with his parents to La Crosse County, Wisconsin in 1859. Johnson became a farmer, creamery company president and insurance company secretary.

A Lutheran, Johnson married Maria P. Hanson (1860–1950) on February 18, 1882. They had seven children. Johnson died on January 26, 1933.

Political career
Johnson was elected to the Assembly in 1902 and 1904. In addition, he was chairman (similar to mayor), assessor and clerk of the school board of Holland, La Crosse County, Wisconsin and chairman of the La Crosse County board of supervisors. He was a Republican.

References

19th-century Lutherans
Norwegian emigrants to the United States
People from La Crosse County, Wisconsin
Republican Party members of the Wisconsin State Assembly
Mayors of places in Wisconsin
County supervisors in Wisconsin
School board members in Wisconsin
Farmers from Wisconsin
1854 births
1933 deaths